Brett Young is the debut studio album by American the country pop singer of the same name, and his fourth album overall. Young is a featured co-writer on 11 out of the 12 tracks on the album, which was produced by Dann Huff and recorded in Nashville. The album was released on February 10, 2017, through Big Machine Label Group. The album was produced by Dann Huff, known for working with crossover-friendly country pop acts like Rascal Flatts and Keith Urban.

Background
Young co-wrote 11 of the 12 songs on the album, including the four singles from the album, "Sleep Without You", "In Case You Didn't Know", "Like I Loved You" and "Mercy". Six of these songs had been previously released on his self-titled EP. Young stressed the importance of honesty in his music; according to him, of the 12 songs in the album, 10 of them he had lived, and the other two he can completely relate to. He said that the album is "a very clear picture of me as a person." Young also said: "I really wanted to make sure that I put a lot of myself into these songs so that fans were given a chance to get to know me when they listened. Watching people sing these songs back to us at live shows means so much more knowing that they aren’t just connection to words but also to my genuine life experience. I think vulnerability is important in songwriting and I feel like show that."

Critical reception
Laura Hostelley of Sounds Like Nashville reviewed the album positively, and described Young's debut effort as "straying away from the 'bro-country' trend, to mark his own genuine path by not being afraid to be vulnerable in matters of the heart."

Commercial performance
Brett Young debuted at number two on the Top Country Albums chart, and number 18 on the US Billboard 200, based on 17,800 copies sold (25,000 equivalent album units when tracks and streams are included).  On August 7, 2018, the album was certified platinum by the Recording Industry Association of America (RIAA) for combined sales and album-equivalent units of over a million units in the United States. The album has sold 253,400 copies in the United States as of January 2019.

Track listing

Personnel
Adapted from liner notes

J. Bonilla - programming (tracks 1, 4, 6)
Joeie Canaday - bass guitar (tracks 1, 3, 4, 6, 7, 11)
Ben Caver - background vocals (tracks 1, 5-7, 10)
Paul Franklin - steel guitar (tracks 3, 4, 7)
Dann Huff - acoustic guitar (tracks 4, 11), electric guitar (all tracks except 12), bouzouki (track 6), electric guitar solo (tracks 1, 6), ganjo (track 4), keyboards (tracks 6, 7), mandolin (tracks 1, 6, 11), percussion (track 7), programming (track 7), slide guitar (track 6)
Charlie Judge - keyboards (all tracks except 12), piano (track 12), programming (tracks 2, 9)
Rob McNelley - electric guitar (tracks 1, 3, 4, 6, 7, 11), electric guitar solo (track 7)
Noah Needleman - background vocals (track 2)
Jerry Roe - drums (tracks 2, 9)
Jimmie Lee Sloas - bass guitar (tracks 2, 5, 8-11)
Aaron Sterling - drums (tracks 1, 3-8, 10, 11)
Russell Terrell - background vocals (tracks 3, 4, 8, 9, 11, 12) 
Ilya Toshinsky - acoustic guitar (tracks 1-5, 7-10), mandolin (track 1), resonator guitar (track 7)
Derek Wells - electric guitar (2, 5, 6, 8-11)
Brett Young - lead vocals (all tracks), background vocals (track 6)

Charts

Weekly charts

Year-end charts

Decade-end charts

Certifications

References

2017 debut albums
Brett Young (singer) albums
Big Machine Records albums
Albums produced by Dann Huff